Herman Chan-En Liu or Liu Zhan'en (1886 – April 7, 1938) was an educator and civic leader in China.

Early life and education 
Liu was born in Hanyang, Hubei. He earned a bachelor's degree at Soochow University in 1918, and a master's degree from the University of Chicago. He was awarded a Ph.D. degree with the dissertation "Nonverbal intelligence tests for use in China" at Teachers College, Columbia University.

Career 
Liu returned to China in 1922, and was the national educational secretary for the YMCA in China. From 1928 to 1938, he was the first Chinese president of University of Shanghai. He attended international conferences in the United States, Switzerland and Finland, wrote educational pamphlets, and married fellow educator and activist Liu-Wang Liming.

Assassination 
After the 1937 Battle of Nanking, University of Shanghai was in a vital position for information sharing. Liu was assassinated by the Japanese on a bus stop in Shanghai on the date of April 7, 1938, after he secretly transferred Nanjing Massacre photos.

References 

Educators from Hubei
1886 births
1938 deaths
Assassinated Chinese people
People executed by Japanese occupation forces
Chinese Christians
Soochow University (Suzhou) alumni
Teachers College, Columbia University alumni
University of Chicago alumni